Cerithiopsis aralia is a species of sea snail, a gastropod in the family Cerithiopsidae, which is known from the Gulf of Mexico. It was described by Olsson and Harbison in 1953.

Description 
The maximum recorded shell length is 3.3 mm.

Habitat 
Minimum recorded depth is 15 m. Maximum recorded depth is 101 m.

References

aralia
Gastropods described in 1953